On April 3, 2009, a mass shooting occurred at the American Civic Association immigration center in Binghamton, New York. At approximately 10:30 a.m. EDT, Jiverly Antares Wong (also known as Jiverly Voong), a 41-year-old naturalized American citizen from Vietnam, entered the facility and killed thirteen people and wounded four others before committing suicide. 

It is the deadliest mass shooting by a lone gunman in the state of New York.

Shooting
At about 10:30 a.m. EDT, Jiverly Wong barricaded the rear door of the Binghamton American Civic Association building with a vehicle registered in his father's name. He was described as wearing a bullet-proof vest, a bright green nylon jacket, and dark-rimmed glasses.

Wong entered through the front door, firing a number of bullets at people in his path. At 10:30 am, Broome County Communications received several 911 calls, and the first police were dispatched to the scene. Two of the Civic Association's receptionists were among the first victims shot. While one of the receptionists was reported to have been shot through the head and killed, the second, shot in the stomach, feigned death and, when the gunman moved on, took cover under a desk and called 911. The receptionist's call was taken by 911 staff at 10:38 am. The wounded receptionist, 61-year-old Shirley DeLucia, remained on the line for 39 minutes, despite her gunshot wound, and relayed information until she was rescued. She later recounted that the gunman had opened fire without saying anything.

The gunman entered a classroom just off the main reception areas, where an ESL class was being given to students. Out of the 16 people in the room, Wong hit 13 of them, including the professor. He then took dozens of other students hostage. Police arrived within minutes of the 911 calls. Hearing the alarms, Wong committed suicide by shooting himself at 10:33 am, three minutes after he first opened fire. In all, Wong fired 99 rounds: 88 from a 9mm Beretta and 11 from a .45-caliber Beretta.

Police response
Police remained at the perimeter of the property, having locked down nearby Binghamton High School and a number of streets in the area. At one point, not knowing if the gunman was alive or dead, police summoned Broome Community College Assistant Professor Tuong Hung Nguyen, who is fluent in Vietnamese, to help communicate with Wong in the event of contact.

SWAT members entered the Civic Center building and began clearing it at 11:13 am—43 minutes after the first call to the police at 10:30 am, and 40 minutes after patrol officers first arrived on the scene at 10:33 am. At the time of their entry, they had not yet confirmed that Wong had committed suicide, and they proceeded with caution. At approximately 12:00 pm, ten people left the building, with another ten following approximately forty minutes later. Some of the hostages had escaped to a basement, while more than a dozen remained hidden in a closet. Thanh Huynh, a high school teacher of Vietnamese background, was asked to interpret so the Vietnamese survivors could be interviewed by the police.

Wong was found dead from a self-inflicted gunshot wound, in the first-floor classroom with his victims. Items found on Wong's body included a hunting knife in the waistband of his pants; a bag of ammunition which was tied around his neck; and two semi-automatic pistols (a .45-caliber Beretta Px4 Storm and a 9mm Beretta 92FS Vertec Inox matching the serial numbers on his New York State pistol license). Also found at the scene were a number of loaded magazines, at least two empty magazines with a 30-round capacity each, and a firearm laser sight.

By 2:33 pm, SWAT had completed the clearing of the building, and all those inside had been evacuated.

Perpetrator

Jiverly Antares Wong (born Linh Phat Vuong, ; December 8, 1967 – April 3, 2009), a resident of Johnson City, New York, was identified as the perpetrator.

Wong was born into an ethnic Chinese (Chinese Nùng) family in South Vietnam. He and his parents, Henry Voong and Mui Thong, immigrated to New York in the late 1980s; he moved to California some time later. In 1992, Wong was arrested there and convicted of a misdemeanor charge of fraud for forgery. Wong became a naturalized American citizen in November 1995; the following year, he registered a gun in Broome County, New York. Sometime after that, he left the United States to live in Ottawa, Ontario, in Canada.

He returned to the U.S., taking up residence in Inglewood, California, in December 1999. In California, Wong registered another gun. While living there, Wong married and later divorced Xiu Ping Jiang. The couple had no children. Wong worked for almost seven years as a delivery man for Kikka Sushi, a catering company located in Los Angeles.

Wong failed to show up to work one day in July 2007, having moved to Binghamton, New York, that month, near his parents. Later, he called the company to get a copy of his W-2 earnings statement in 2008, asking that it be forwarded to a New York state address. Although early reports suggested Wong had recently lost his job at a local IBM plant in nearby Endicott, New York, IBM said they had no records showing Wong had ever worked for the company. Wong worked at a local Shop-Vac vacuum cleaner plant until it closed in November 2008.

Wong had been taking English classes at the center, beginning in January 2009 and continuing through March. His attendance was intermittent, and he stopped coming altogether. He shot the students and teacher in the classroom where he had formerly attended sessions.

Possible motives
Several sources suggested possible motives for Wong's attack, including feelings of being "degraded and disrespected" for his poor English language skills, depression over losing his job, and difficulty in finding work in New York. A few years before the killings, he had worked as an engineer at Endicott Interconnect Technologies, a high-tech electronics company. In 2004, the company laid off five percent of its workforce. A coworker from that time said of him, "He was quiet—not a violent person" and "I can't believe he would do something like this." Press TV noted that Pakistani Taliban leader Baitullah Mehsud claimed responsibility for the shooting, saying, "They were my men. I gave them orders in reaction to US drone attacks." However, a spokesman for the Federal Bureau of Investigation discounted the claim as inconsistent with their evidence that Wong was the lone gunman.

Binghamton Police Chief Joseph Zikuski said, "From the people close to him ... this action he took was not a surprise to them." Wong had allegedly made comments such as "America sucks" and talked about assassinating President Barack Obama to his former coworkers at Shop Vac.

Package mailed to TV station
Several days after the shooting, an envelope was received by the Syracuse, New York, TV station News 10 Now dated March 18, 2009, and postmarked April 3, 2009, the day of the shooting. The three stamps used for the postage were a Liberty Bell and two Purple Hearts.

The package contained a two-page handwritten letter; photos of Wong, holding guns while smiling; a gun permit; and Wong's driver's license. Of the letter itself, most of its content was a rambling, paranoid accusation of perceived police misconduct and persecution of him, especially through "secret" visits to his residences.

Victims
Wong killed 13 people and critically wounded four. An account of each of the victims was published in The New York Times on April 6, 2009.

Killed
Parveen Ali, age 26, an immigrant from northern Pakistan
Almir Olimpio Alves, age 43, a Brazilian PhD in Mathematics and visiting scholar at Binghamton University, attending English classes at the Civic Association
Marc Henry Bernard, age 44, an immigrant from Haiti
Maria Sonia Bernard, age 46, another immigrant from Haiti
Li Guo, age 47, a visiting scholar from China
Lan Ho, age 39, an immigrant from Vietnam
Layla Khalil, age 53, an Iraqi mother of three children
Roberta King, age 72, an English language teacher who was substituting for a vacationing teacher and who had also substituted at local schools for many years
Jiang Ling, age 22, an immigrant from China
Hong Xiu "Amy" Mao Marsland, age 35, a nail stylist who also immigrated from China in 2006
Dolores Yigal, age 53, a recent immigrant from the Philippines
Hai Hong Zhong, age 54, a third immigrant from China
Maria Zobniw, age 60, a part-time caseworker at the Civic Association, whose parents were from Ukraine

Wounded
The injured were treated for gunshot wounds at Wilson Medical Center in Johnson City and Our Lady of Lourdes Memorial Hospital in Binghamton.

Shirley DeLucia, age 61, the Civic Association receptionist who feigned death and contacted police
Long Huynh, age 42, a Vietnamese immigrant whose wife, Lan Ho, was killed. Huynh had tried to shield her with his body, but a bullet that shattered Huynh's elbow ricocheted, striking and killing his wife. Huynh was wounded three more times: he lost a finger to a shot, was hit by a bullet in his chest, and another bullet entered his chin and exited through his cheek.
Two other unnamed people

Response 
 President Barack Obama referred to the shooting as "senseless violence" and offered sympathy to the victims.
 New York Governor David Paterson ordered state flags to be flown at half staff on April 8, 2009.
 Wong's parents, Henry Voong and Mui Thong of Johnson City, New York, issued a statement apologizing for their son's actions, expressing their shared grief and asking for forgiveness from the victims' families.

See also
 Gun violence in the United States
 Mass shootings in the United States

References

External links 

Binghamton siege pictures – BBC
"Binghamton Victims Shared a Dream of Living Better Lives", New York Times, April 6, 2009, obituary for the victims
Image of Wong's two page handwritten letter sent to local news station (pdf)
 

2009 active shooter incidents in the United States
2009 in New York (state)
2009 mass shootings in the United States
2009 murders in the United States
2000s crimes in New York (state)
21st-century mass murder in the United States
April 2009 crimes in the United States
April 2009 events in the United States
Attacks in the United States in 2009
Binghamton, New York
Deaths by firearm in New York (state)
Hostage taking in the United States
Mass murder in 2009
Mass murder in New York (state)
Mass murder in the United States
Mass shootings in New York (state)
Mass shootings in the United States
Massacres in the United States
Murder–suicides in New York